The Stollhof Hoard  was found in 1864 in the municipality of Hohe Wand in Lower Austria by a shepherd at the height 700–800 m above the village of Stollhof. The  hoard dates from the 4th Millennium BC in the Copper Age.  The discs are the earliest gold objects to be found in Austria. 
The hoard consists of:

 9 spiral rolls with lengths between about 5.6 and 24 cmx 
 6 double spiral pendants made of round wire . Two of them wrapped tightly with a small element loop and four loosely wound with large centre loop. The outer diameters of the coils are from 10.1 to 12.3 cm.
 2 flat axes length of about 14 cm and 16.5 cm
 2 spiral bracelets (9.5 cm and 10 cm whorls ) section 5.0 and 5.5 cm, length 7.0 and 7.5 cm
 2 gold discs diameter 10.6 and 13.8 cm, weight 71 and 121 gr
 1 eberzahnförmiges Zierblech length 15.2 cm. 

The gold discs are decorated with repousse ornament and were attached to clothing by a thread through the small holes.. To the discs have parallels from  Brześć Kujawski and Jordansmühl in Poland (where they occur with other finds) and at Zalaszentgrót ( Csáford, Hungary)

One of the axes belongs to P. Patay’s Szakálhát type, which is typical of the Bodrogkeresztur culture.

Some of the finds from the hoard never reached Naturhistorische Museum in Vienna, where the hoard is on display.

External links 
 William Angeli : The hoard of Stollhof  Ann . . Naturhistor . Mus. Vienna 70 , pp. 491–496 , Vienna, October 1967 

Lower Austria
Archaeological discoveries in Austria
Archaeological discoveries in Europe
Copper Age Europe
Treasure troves
1864 archaeological discoveries